GonVisor is a freeware sequential image viewer utility for Microsoft Windows used mainly to view digital images in the style of a comic book, manga or magazine. It has some additional features to create and manage archives and also to enhance the images.

It is created for Windows system, but it is almost compatible to run in Linux/Solaris/Mac using Wine (software).

Features
 Open Comic Book Archive files, directories with images and standard images.
 Create Comic Book Archive files, a description file and a password can be added.
 Adjust automatically image to the screen size.
 Full screen mode.
 Image transition effects.
 Reduce automatically margins.
 Enhange images adjusting different parameters to correct bad scanned images.
 Page through the images sequentially and scroll around pages with single key presses or mouse buttons.
 Display one or two pages at one time.
 Extraction of the images contained in a comic book archive.
 Bookmarks.
 Customizable hotkeys and mouse functions.
 Rating and management of comic book archives.
 Print images adjusting the image size.
 Bulk rename of image files.
 Music player control (Spotify, Winamp, Windows Media Player).
 Boss key to camouflage its window quickly.
 Multilanguage: Available in English, French, Spanish, Portuguese, Italian, German, Czech, Serbian and Dutch.

Files
GonVisor supports all major image formats, comic book reader files such as cbr, cbz, cb7 or cba, pdf files, and compressed files containing images. These formats were made popular by CDisplay but is now used by many other programs designed for reading comics. GonVisor also supports standard image formats (JPEG, PNEG, BMP..), directories of images and PDF format.

See also 
 Comparison of image viewers

References

External links
 

Image viewers
Windows-only freeware